Betty Cody (August 17, 1921 – July 1, 2014) was a Canadian-born country music singer. Her notable singles include the 1952 RCA releases "Tom Tom Yodel" and "I Found Out More Than You Ever Knew", and "Please Throw Away The Glass" released by RCA in 1954. In 1979, Cody was inducted into the Maine Country Music Hall Of Fame.

Early years
She was born Rita Francis Coté to Alphonse and Albina Coté in Sherbrooke, Quebec, Canada, the sixth of 11 children. When still a child she moved to Auburn, Maine.

Career
In 1940, Betty Cody married Harold Breau, a musician who performed as Hal Lone Pine. The couple started performing together and she adopted the stage name of Betty Cody. The couple moved to New Brunswick in 1948 and Cody signed a contract with RCA Records in the early 1950s. In 1952 she had her hit in the U.S. country charts with "Tom Tom Yodel". Her 1953 hit single "I Found Out More Than You Ever Knew" reached No. 10 on the Billboard country chart. In 1957, the Breau family moved to Winnipeg, Manitoba, where they performed on CTV Television. Slim Andrews, the chair on the board of directors of the Maine Country Music Hall of Fame called her "the number one country singer to ever go out of the state of Maine."

Personal life
After splitting from her husband she gave up her career and worked in a shoe shop in Lewiston, Maine to care for her three younger sons. Betty and Harold eventually divorced. Her eldest son, Lenny Breau, who had lived with his father, later moved to California. Lenny became a noted jazz guitarist. In 1984, Lenny Breau's dead body was found in a swimming pool. The death was ruled a murder and the case was never solved. Another son, Denny Breau, is also a musician.

Cody married, secondly, to George Binette, by which marriage she became stepmother to four children. Binette died in 2002.

Death
Betty Cody died from undisclosed illness on July 1, 2014, at age 92 in Lewiston, Maine.

References

1921 births
2014 deaths
American country singer-songwriters
American women singer-songwriters
American women singers
Canadian emigrants to the United States
Canadian country musicians
Country musicians from Maine
People from Auburn, Maine
People from Lewiston, Maine
Musicians from Sherbrooke
Musicians from Winnipeg
Songwriters from Maine
Songwriters from Quebec
Writers from Sherbrooke
21st-century American women